Until the Celebration is a fantasy novel by Zilpha Keatley Snyder, the third book in the Green Sky Trilogy.

Plot summary 

Now that the Geets-kel have decided to reveal their secrets and integrate Erdlings with Kindar, there is much concern over how to do it properly. A lifetime of beliefs will not be converted easily and there are numerous logistical issues to consider. The truth is. first brought to the Kindar leaders. The Ol-zhaan clergy know their lofty place in society will be diminished, but many eagerly volunteer to help with the newcomers.

The initial idea is to release the Erdlings slowly over time, but the Erdlings have quickly figured out where the opening is and are already building homes in the open air. Erdling terrorist Axon Befal has sworn vengeance and attacks an Ol-zhaan, violence unheard of in Kindar society.

The tool-of-violence goes missing as do Pomma and Teera, the "holy children". Axon Befal sends a message that he has kidnapped the girls and will kill them unless Orbora is turned over to his control. A Kindar servant who has been working for D'ol Regle reveals that she took the tool-of-violence to bring to him, but decided against giving it to him. She reveals she has been badly burned just carrying it around in her knapsack. The Council decides the weapon must be destroyed and agree to seal it in lead, take it to the Erdling caverns and drop it into the Bottomless Lake.

Raamo leads the procession to dispose of the tool-of-violence, followed by a huge crowd, not all of whom agree with the plan and think it should be kept "just in case". Confused by their thoughts, he slips and falls into the lake with it and is assumed dead. One of Befal's terrorists admits he was supposed to kill Raamo, but could not do it and expresses great remorse.

D'ol Falla is at a loss for words when addressing the gathered people at the one-year Celebration of the Rejoyning, but the first thing that comes to her mind is that they should celebrate indeed, for the Erdlings are free and the people have largely come together as a united society -- instead of Kindar, Erdling and Ol-zhaan, they can all just be the Zhaan, the people. Almost immediately, word comes that the little girls have been found; they had run away to escape the pressure of their "holy children" responsibilities. As Teera's father and then Hiro speak to the gathering, D'ol Falla finds the back room where the children are playing. Off to the side, two little boys telekinetically lift a huge urn off a high shelf and float it gently to the floor. Teera laughingly tells the old lady they've been teaching the other children their "game."

External links 

1977 American novels
1977 science fiction novels
Children's fantasy novels
Children's science fiction novels
American science fiction novels
American fantasy novels
Science fantasy novels
Novels by Zilpha Keatley Snyder
Atheneum Books books